Psychrobacter submarinus is a Gram-negative, oxidase- and catalase-positive, psychrophilic, halophilic nonmotile aerobic bacterium of the genus Psychrobacter, which was isolated from seawater at a depth of 300 m from the Pacific Ocean.

References

External links
Type strain of Psychrobacter submarinus at BacDive -  the Bacterial Diversity Metadatabase
 	

Moraxellaceae
Bacteria described in 2002
Psychrophiles
Halophiles